Château Rose ("pink castle") is a château in Orp-le-Petit in the municipality of Orp-Jauche, Walloon Brabant, Wallonia, Belgium.

See also
List of castles in Belgium

Castles in Belgium
Castles in Walloon Brabant
Chateau Rose